In algebraic geometry, a Bordiga surface is a certain sort of rational surface of degree 6 in P4, introduced by Giovanni Bordiga.

A Bordiga surface is isomorphic to the projective plane blown up in 10 points, the embedding into P4 is given by the 5-dimensional space of quartics passing through the 10 points. White surfaces are the generalizations using more points.

References

Complex surfaces
Algebraic surfaces